The 24th Hong Kong Film Awards ceremony was held on 27 March 2005, in the Hong Kong Coliseum and hosted by Carol Cheng and Lawrence Cheng. Twenty-nine winners in nineteen categories were unveiled, with films Kung Fu Hustle and 2046 being the year's biggest winners. In conjunction with a hundred years of the Chinese cinema, a list of Best 100 Chinese Motion Pictures, consisting of 103 Chinese films selected by a panel of 101 filmmakers, critics and scholars, was also unveiled during the ceremony.

Awards

The Star of the Century Award was a special award presented at the 24th Hong Kong Film Awards in celebration of 100 years of Chinese cinema. The award was posthumously dedicated to martial artist Bruce Lee with his daughter Shannon Lee collecting it on his behalf.

Winners are listed first, highlighted in boldface, and indicated with a double dagger.

References

External links
 Official website of the Hong Kong Film Awards

2005
2004 film awards
2005 in Hong Kong
Hong